Dangers To Olympia Marble

Euchloe olympia, the Olympia marble, is a butterfly in the family Pieridae. Its range is southern Canada and the midwest, down into the southwestern United States. E.Olympia is related to E.Guaymasensis but has a distinctive phenotype and genotype.

References
The Olympia Marble has been classified globally as G5/G4, meaning that globally it is a relatively stable species. The United States has not placed it under any watch as a country. However, it is in danger due to Gypsy Moth chemical control.
 Euchloe Olympia exhibits individualistic behavior in many aspects. Such as its phenotype and genotype but also its feeding and mating behavior.
Euchloe
Butterflies of North America
Butterflies described in 1871
Taxa named by William Henry Edwards